Oberst is a military rank corresponding to Colonel OF-5 in Anglophone countries, or Polkovnik in Slavophone armed forces.

Oberst may also refer to:

People 
 Oberst (surname), a surname of Germanic origin
 Bill Oberst Jr. (born 1965), American stage, film and television actor
 Conor Oberst (born 1980), American singer-songwriter
 Eugene Oberst (1901–1991), American athlete
 Jack Oberst (1918–2009), American professional basketball player
 Maximilian Oberst (1849–1925), German physician and surgeon
 Robert Oberst (born 1984), American strongman

Places 
 Oberst, locality in the city of Wuppertal, North Rhine-Westphalia, Germany
 Oberst Glacier, a glacier in the Sor Rondane Mountains, Antarctica

See also 
 Ober (disambiguation)